Simbu can refer to

 Chimbu Province, alternative spelling of the province of Papua New Guinea
 Kuman language (New Guinea), also known as Chimbu or Simbu
 Chimbu River
 Silambarasan Rajendar, Tamil actor